The Middle East Treaty Organization (METO), also known as the Baghdad Pact and subsequently known as the Central Treaty Organization (CENTO), was a military alliance of the Cold War. It was formed in 24 February 1955 by Iran, Iraq, Pakistan, Turkey, and the United Kingdom. The alliance was dissolved in 16 March 1979.

US pressure and promises of military and economic aid were key in the negotiations leading to the agreement, but the United States could not initially participate. John Foster Dulles, who was involved in the negotiations as United States Secretary of State under President Dwight D. Eisenhower, claimed that was due to "the pro-Israel lobby and the difficulty of obtaining Congressional Approval." Others said that the reason was "for purely technical reasons of budgeting procedures."

In 1958, the US joined the military committee of the alliance. It is generally viewed as one of the least successful of the Cold War alliances.

The organisation’s headquarters was in Baghdad, Iraq from 1955 to 1958 and thereafter in Ankara, Turkey from 1958 to 1979. Cyprus was also an important location for METO due to the British military bases in Akrotiri and Dhekelia along with the island's proximity to the Middle East.

History

Modeled after the North Atlantic Treaty Organisation (NATO), METO committed the nations to mutual cooperation and protection, as well as non-intervention in each other's affairs. Its goal was to contain the Soviet Union (USSR) by having a line of strong states along the Soviet Union's southwestern frontier. Similarly, it was known as the 'Northern Tier' to prevent Soviet expansion into the Middle East. Unlike NATO, METO did not have a unified military command structure, nor were many American or British military bases established in member countries, although the United States had communications and electronic intelligence facilities in Iran, and operated U-2 intelligence flights over the Soviet Union from bases in Pakistan. The United Kingdom had access to facilities in Pakistan and Iraq at various times while the treaty was in effect.  

On July 14, 1958, the Iraqi monarchy was overthrown in a military coup. The new government was led by General Abdul Karim Qasim who withdrew Iraq from the Baghdad Pact, opened diplomatic relations with Soviet Union and adopted a non-aligned stance. The organization dropped the name 'Baghdad Pact' in favor of 'CENTO' at that time.

The Middle East and South Asia became extremely volatile areas during the 1960s with the ongoing Arab–Israeli conflict and the Indo-Pakistani wars. CENTO was unwilling to get deeply involved in either dispute. In 1965 and 1971, Pakistan tried unsuccessfully to get assistance in its wars with India through CENTO, but this was rejected under the idea that CENTO was aimed at containing the Soviet Union, not India.

CENTO did little to prevent the expansion of Soviet influence to non-member states in the area. Whatever containment value the pact might have had was lost when the Soviets 'leap-frogged' the member states, establishing close military and political relationships with governments in Egypt, Syria, Iraq, South Yemen, Somalia, and Libya. By 1970, the Soviet Union had deployed over 20,000 troops to Egypt, and had established naval bases in Syria, Somalia, and South Yemen.

The Iranian Revolution spelled the end of the organization in 1979, but in reality, it essentially had been finished since 1974, when Turkey invaded Cyprus. This led the United Kingdom to withdraw forces that had been earmarked to the alliance, and the United States Congress halted military aid to Turkey despite two Presidential vetoes. With the fall of the Iranian monarchy, whatever remaining rationale for the organization was lost. Future U.S. and British defence agreements with regional countries—such as Pakistan, Egypt, and the Persian Gulf states—were conducted bilaterally.

With the withdrawal of Iran, the Secretary-General of CENTO, Turkish diplomat Kamuran Gurun, announced on March 16, 1979, that he would call a meeting of the pact's council in order to formally dissolve the organization.

Membership
  (since April 1955),
  (until March 1959),
  (November 1955 — March 1979),
  (September 1955 — March 1979),
 
Turkey's role in the Baghdad Pact was one of a unique and elevated nature compared to other nations such as Iraq. It was given "special" attention by the West primarily due to their geopolitical importance. It was believed that they could draw Arab countries, such as Iraq, closer to the projected anti-communist Arab alliance, as the former would have been of inspiration for other “like-minded” countries. It was also hoped that by agreeing to the Baghdad Pact the Turkish and the Iraqi relations would get their time in the sun. However, this optimism was not rewarded as Iraq was under constant threat of the infiltration of Turkish troops and Nuri was desperate to strike an agreement. Finally, the Turkish courting by western nations, such as the USA, did not have the outcome that was desired as Arab countries, primarily Egypt, turned hostile to the pact.

Timeline

 February 1954: Turkey signs a Pact of Mutual Cooperation with Pakistan.
 19 May 1954: U.S. and Pakistan sign a Mutual Defense Assistance Agreement.
 24 February 1955: Iraq and Turkey sign a military agreement in Baghdad and the term "Baghdad Pact" started to be used. United Kingdom (5 April), Pakistan (23 September) and Iran (3 November) joined the Baghdad Pact in the same year.
 October 1958: Baghdad Pact headquarters moved from Baghdad to Ankara.
 5 March 1959: U.S. signs military agreements with Pakistan, Iran and Turkey.
 24 March 1959: The new republican regime of Iraq withdrew the country from the alliance.
 19 August 1959: METO renamed CENTO.
1965: Pakistan tried to get help from its allies in its war against India. The United Nations Security Council passed Resolution 211 on September 20 and the United States and the United Kingdom supported the UN decision by cutting off arms supplies to both belligerents.
1971: In a new war with India, Pakistan again tried unsuccessfully to get allied assistance. (The U.S. provided limited military support to Pakistan, but not under the rubric of CENTO.)
1974: The United Kingdom withdraws forces from the alliance following the Turkish invasion of Cyprus.
11 March 1979: The new government of the Islamic Republic of Iran withdrew the country from CENTO.
12 March 1979: Pakistan withdraws from CENTO.
16 March 1979: CENTO is formally disbanded. United Kingdom and Turkey withdraws from CENTO.

Secretaries General

A Secretary General, appointed by the council of ministers for a renewable three years, oversaw CENTO activities. Secretaries general were:

CENTO railway
CENTO sponsored a railway line, some of which was completed, to enable a rail connection between London and Tehran via Van. A section from Lake Van in Turkey to Sharafkhaneh in Iran was completed and funded in large part by CENTO (mainly the UK). The civil engineering was especially challenging because of the difficult terrain. Part of the route included a rail ferry across Lake Van with a terminal at Tatvan on the Western side of the lake.

Cultural and research institutions
Like its counterparts NATO and SEATO, CENTO sponsored a number of cultural and scientific research institutions:
 CENTO Conferences on Teaching Public Health and Public Health Practice
 CENTO Cultural Works Programme 
 CENTO Institute of Nuclear & Applied Science
 CENTO Scientific Coordinating Board
 CENTO Scientific Council
 CENTO Symposia on Rural Development

The institutions supported a wide range of non-military activities, with a particular focus on agriculture and development, In 1960, for example, CENTO had funded 37 projects covering agriculture, education, health, economic development and transportation. It also arranged at least one symposium on the problem of foot-and-mouth and rinderpest.

The organisation that became the CENTO Institute of Nuclear Science was established by Western powers in the Baghdad Pact, as CENTO was then known. It was initially located in Baghdad, Iraq, but was relocated to Tehran, Iran in 1958 after Iraq withdrew from CENTO. Students from Pakistan and Turkey as well as those from Iran were trained at the Institute.

CENTO Scientific Council
The CENTO Scientific Council organized a number of scientific symposia and other events, including a meeting in Lahore, Pakistan, in 1962, entitled "The Role of Science in the Development of Natural Resources with Particular Reference to Pakistan, Iran and Turkey".

See also
ANZUS
Arab–Israeli alliance against Iran
Balkan Pact (1953)
Economic Cooperation Organization
Inter-American Treaty of Reciprocal Assistance
Islamic Military Counter Terrorism Coalition (IMCTC)
NATO
Regional Cooperation for Development
Shanghai Cooperation Organisation
Southeast Asia Treaty Organization

References

Further reading
 Cohen, Michael J. "From ‘Cold’ to ‘Hot’ War: Allied Strategic and Military Interests in the Middle East after the Second World War." Middle Eastern Studies 43.5 (2007): 725-748.
 Hashmi, Sohail H. "‘Zero Plus Zero Plus Zero’: Pakistan, the Baghdad Pact, and the Suez Crisis." International History Review 33.3 (2011): 525-544. 

 Jalal, Ayesha. "Towards the Baghdad Pact: South Asia and Middle East Defence in the Cold War, 1947-1955." International History Review 11.3 (1989): 409-433.
 Kuniholm, Bruce R. The origins of the Cold War in the Near East: Great power conflict and diplomacy in Iran, Turkey, and Greece (Princeton University Press, 2014).
 Podeh, Elie. The quest for hegemony in the Arab world: The struggle over the Baghdad Pact (Brill, 1995).
 Yesilbursa, Behcet Kemal. The Baghdad Pact: Anglo-American Defence Policies in the Middle East, 1950-59 (2003) excerpt

External links
Central Treaty Organization (CENTO) entry in Encyclopaedia Iranica

CENTO on the US State Department's website.

Treaties concluded in 1955
Cold War alliances and military strategy
Cold War treaties
1958 in the United States
Former international organizations
International military organizations
20th-century military alliances
1979 disestablishments
Intergovernmental organizations established by treaty
Organizations established in 1955
1955 in international relations
Iraq–United Kingdom relations
Treaties of the Kingdom of Iraq
Military alliances involving the United Kingdom
Military alliances involving Iraq
Military alliances involving the United States
Military alliances involving Iran
Military alliances involving Pakistan
Treaties of the Dominion of Pakistan
Treaties of Pahlavi Iran
Treaties of Turkey
Treaties of the United Kingdom
Articles containing video clips
1955 establishments in Iraq
Anti-communism in Iraq